Private Asset Management (also known as PAM) is a magazine for the wealth management and family office industry. It is headquartered in London.

The magazine is published by With Intelligence on a monthly basis. It provides news on emerging trends in the industry, suggested best-practices, news about personal changes, and articles targeted to multi- and single-family offices, as well as wealth management firms.

Notes

External links

Business magazines published in the United Kingdom
Monthly magazines published in the United Kingdom
Magazines published in London
Magazines with year of establishment missing